Saint-Martin-la-Méanne (Limousin: Sent Martin la Mediana) is a commune in the Corrèze department in central France.

Population

See also
Communes of the Corrèze department

References

Communes of Corrèze